Si-Lan Chen (1905–1996), also known as Sylvia Si-Lan Chen Leyda, Chen Xuelan, or Chen Xilan, was a dancer, choreographer, and activist of Chinese and Afro-Caribbean descent.

Life 
Si-Lan Chen was born in Trinidad in 1905 (some sources also give her birth year as 1909), the daughter of Eugene Chen, a Chinese lawyer and diplomat, and Agatha Alphosin Ganteaume, a Trinidadian woman of French Creole heritage. In 1912, she moved to London, where she studied dance at the Stedman Academy. In 1926, she moved to China, where her father held the position of foreign minister in the government of Sun Yat-Sen. In 1927, her family fled to Moscow after Chiang Kai-Shek took power in China. While in Moscow, Chen enrolled in the school of the Bolshoi Ballet and subsequently studied modern dance, including working with the avant-garde choreographer Kasyan Goleizovsky, becoming an early exponent of modern dance in the Soviet Union. She was also the first ballet teacher of her cousin, Dai Ailian, who would go on to become an influential figure in modern dance in China.

Chen was romantically involved with the poet Langston Hughes during his visit to Moscow in 1932. In 1933, she met Jay Leyda, an American filmmaker and film historian, whom she married in 1934. During the 1930s and 1940s, following the Japanese invasion of China, she performed in benefits to raise relief funds for China, touring in the U.S., Mexico, and the Caribbean, and was an active supporter of anti-imperialist movements. During this time, she also worked in Hollywood as a choreographer and dance instructor, appearing in some films, such as The Keys to the Kingdom (1944).

Due to her leftist commitments, Chen was monitored by the FBI and forced to frequently leave and re-enter the U.S. by the American immigration authorities, despite her marriage to a U.S. citizen. In 1984, she published an autobiography, Footnote to History. A collection of her papers is housed at the New York University libraries, including her correspondence with Langston Hughes and Pearl S. Buck, her FBI file, documentation of her dance career, and other writings.

Works of choreography 
Landlord on a Horse (1938)
Shanghai Sketches (1938)
Two Chinese Women (1938)
Chinese Student-Dedication (1938)
In Conquered Nanking (1939)
Uzbec Dance (1939)

Writings 
Footnote to History, ed. Sally Banes (Dance Horizons, 1984), autobiography.

References

External links 
Photograph of Si-lan Chen, University of California Calisphere

1905 births
1996 deaths
Modern dancers
20th-century ballet dancers
Trinidad and Tobago dancers
Trinidad and Tobago emigrants to the United States